The Mango Tree is a 1977 Australian drama film directed by Kevin James Dobson and starring Geraldine Fitzgerald and Sir Robert Helpmann. Lead actor Christopher Pate is the son of actor Michael Pate who also produced and wrote the film. It is based on the book of the same name, by Ronald McKie.

Plot
The film is about Jamie, a young man in his formative teen years, growing up in rural subtropical town of Bundaberg, Queensland, Australia, set around World War I.  Jamie, raised by this grandmother, enjoys his life in "Bundy", until the town's reaction to the insanity of a local preacher leads him to leave his hometown for life in the city.

Cast
Christopher Pate as Jamie Carr
Geraldine Fitzgerald as Grandma Carr
Robert Helpmann as the Professor
Gerard Kennedy as Preacher Jones
Gloria Dawn as Pearl
Carol Burns as Maudie Plover
Barry Pierce as Agnus McDonald
Diane Craig as Miss Pringle
Ben Gabriel as Wilkenshaw
Gerry Duggan as Scanlon
Jonathan Atherton as Stinker Hatch
Tony Bonner as Captain Hinkler
Tony Foley as Private Davis
Tony Barry as Tommy Smith
Terry McDermott as Somers

Production
Michael Pate was a neighbour of Robert McKie, who wrote the novel. Pate optioned it and tried to find a writer to adapt it into a screenplay but ended up doing it himself. The budget was raised from the Australian Film Commission, GUO Film Distributors and the Bundaberg Sugar Company; the latter invested a third of the total sum. The budget was originally $650,000 but production of the film was delayed by 12 months by which time inflation meant it had risen to $800,000.

Michael Pate originally wanted to direct the film himself but the AFC did not want him to write, produce and direct, so insisted he find a director. Pate proposed Michael Lindsay-Hogg, son of Geraldine Fitzgerald, who was unable to do it. Bruce Beresford almost directed until the South Australian Film Corporation, who had the director under contract, intervened and prohibited him from making it. Then in February 1977, two months before shooting was to begin, Pate hired [
Kevin James Dobson

Filming took place in the town of Gayndah, Mount Perry and Cordalba as well as Bundaberg. The shoot went for seven weeks starting April and ending in June.

Release
The Mango Tree enjoyed reasonable success, grossing $1,028,000 at the box office in Australia, which is equivalent to $4,728,800 in 2009 dollars.

Critical reaction was muted, with much criticism falling on the performance of Christopher Pate. However film writer Brian McFarlane later wrote that Geraldine Fitzgerald gave "one of the most luminous performances by an actress in Australian film." The movie achieved only limited sales overseas.

Kevin James Dobson later claimed he felt that the script was never quite right and "one or two performances were a little shonky" but that he has great affection for the movie. There are several different edits of the film available, one by Dobson, one by Pate.

See also
Cinema of Australia

References

External links

The Mango Tree at the National Film and Sound Archive
The Mango Tree at SBS Films
The Mango Tree at Oz Films

1977 films
1977 drama films
Australian drama films
Films scored by Marc Wilkinson
Films directed by Kevin James Dobson
Films set in the 1910s
Films set in Queensland
Films shot in Queensland
1977 directorial debut films
1970s English-language films